A zillion is a fictitious, indefinitely large number.

Zillion or Zillions may also refer to:

 Zillion (anime), 1987 Japanese anime television series and its direct-to-video sequel Zillion: Burning Night, plus spinoffs
 Zillion (video game), released alongside the anime series
 Zillion II, sequel to the first video game
 Zillions of Games, a computer software game-playing engine
 Zillions (magazine), a version of Consumer Reports magazine for children